Charles James McNeil Willoughby (30 March 1894 – 5 September 1995) was a Progressive Conservative party member of the House of Commons of Canada. He was born in Cookstown, Ontario, and became a physician and surgeon by career.

He was first elected at the Kamloops riding in the 1963 general election and served one term, the 26th Canadian Parliament. Willoughby did not seek re-election after this.

External links
 

1894 births
1995 deaths
Members of the House of Commons of Canada from British Columbia
Progressive Conservative Party of Canada MPs
Canadian centenarians
Men centenarians